The two pence (2p) coin was the third smallest denomination of the Irish pound, being worth  of a pound. It was first issued on Decimal Day, 15 February 1971. The coin was minted until 2000. It was the third of three new designs introduced all in bronze, the others being the halfpenny and penny. All featured ornamental birds on the reverse.

The coin was designed by the Irish artist Gabriel Hayes and the design is adapted from the Second Bible of Charles the Bald held at Bibliothèque Nationale in Paris. The coin originally had a diameter of 2.591 centimetres and weight of 7.128 grams consisting of copper, tin and zinc.

In 1990 it was announced that the two-pence coin would be redesigned to incorporate the hare from the pre-decimal threepence, but this plan was abandoned in the face of the imminent adoption of the euro. In 1990 the decision was taken to produce the coin on a copper plated steel base as the bronze had become too expensive. The steel-based coins are magnetic. After reducing the size of the five and ten pence coins introduced in the early 1990s, the two pence coin was the fourth largest Irish coin, with only the twenty and fifty pence and the pound coin coins being larger in the series.

The two-pence coin was withdrawn when euro coins were introduced on 1 January 2002.

References

External links

Irish coinage website – catalogue – decimal two pence
Coinage (Dimensions and Designs) Regulations, 1969
Coinage (Weight and Composition of and Remedy for Certain Copper Coins) Regulations, 1990

two pence (decimal coin)
Two-cent coins